Johan Lange (born 22 November 1979) is a Danish sporting director in professional football, he was formerly a manager and coach. He is currently the Sporting Director of Aston Villa in the English Premier League.

Coaching career 
Lange started his coaching career at Danish Superliga side FC Copenhagen, working as their assistant manager for three and a half years, before departing on 30 June 2012 to join EFL Championship club Wolverhampton Wanderers as assistant manager to Ståle Solbakken.

On 5 January 2013, following a string a poor results, which left Wolves 18th in the Championship - and a FA Cup defeat to non-league Luton Town, Solbakken and his backroom staff were sacked.

On 2 February 2013, Lange was hired as head coach of Lyngby Boldklub in the Danish 1st Division.

Transition into other roles 
In 2014, Lange was reunited with Solbakken, as he rejoined FC Copenhagen as Development Director, the role changing to Technical Director within the same season. In this role he became known for his apparent knack of signing players for a low cost, then later selling them at great profit to Europe's elite clubs, all whilst FC Copenhagen continued to win trophies domestically and compete in the UEFA Champions League.

On 30 July 2020, Lange joined Premier League team Aston Villa as Sporting Director. Following Aston Villa's survival from relegation the previous season, and subsequent departure of Jesus Garcia Pitarch as Sporting Director, Lange was tasked with helping build a team that would challenge at the top half of the Premier League, rather than battle against relegation. The signings of Emi Martínez, Matty Cash, Bertrand Traoré, Ollie Watkins and Morgan Sanson as well as Ross Barkley joining on loan from Chelsea helped Aston Villa to achieve that goal, finishing 11th in Lange's first season, spending most of the season in the top half of the table and having not been in serious danger of relegation at any point of the season.

References 

Living people
1979 births
Danish football managers
Wolverhampton Wanderers F.C. non-playing staff
Aston Villa F.C. non-playing staff
Danish 1st Division managers
Sportspeople from Copenhagen
Association football coaches

Lyngby Boldklub managers
Danish expatriate sportspeople
Danish expatriate sportspeople in England